Ian James is a British racing driver and principle of the Heart of Racing Team, competing in the IMSA SportsCar Championship.  James has 11 total sportscar wins.

In 2004 he had a class victory (LMP2) at the 2004 12 Hours of Sebring and won the LMP2 driving title in the 2004 American Le Mans Series.

In 2015 James had a class victory (GTD) at the 2015 12 Hours of Sebring.

In 2020 James founded the Heart of Racing Team.

In 2023 James not only won the GTD class at the 2023 24 Hours of Daytona, but was the top GTD performer, beating out the more highly structured GTD Pro teams. This win was the first for Aston Martin at the 24 Hours of Daytona, 59 years after their first attempt.

Motorsports career results

24 Hours of Le Mans results

References

24 Hours of Daytona drivers
WeatherTech SportsCar Championship drivers
Living people
British racing drivers
Aston Martin Racing drivers
Year of birth missing (living people)